Benjamin Bosse (November 1, 1875 – April 22, 1922) was an American politician, manufacturer, and businessman who served as the 19th mayor of Evansville, Indiana, from 1914 until his death in 1922.

During his term as mayor, Bosse oversaw the replacement of horse-drawn fire carriages, the relocation of the Evansville Police Department, the brick paving of most downtown streets, and the construction of several new public markets. The city's public recreation department was also formed, resulting in the construction of Evansville’s first public playgrounds, tennis courts and swimming pools. Bosse was also a supporter of Frank Fausch, who founded Evansville's NFL team, the Evansville Crimson Giants.

Early life
Bosse was born on November 1, 1875 to German-American civil engineer Henry Bosse and Caroline L. Schlensker. Spending much of his early childhood in Scott Township, Bosse moved to Evansville at age 14.

See also
Benjamin Bosse High School
Bosse Field
Evansville Crimson Giants

References

The Political Graveyard
Bosse Field facts

1870s births
1922 deaths
Mayors of Evansville, Indiana
Indiana Democrats